Perceptual Outer Dimensions was the music project of Washington, D.C.-based composer Holmes Ives. Under the moniker Ives released two albums for Fifth Colvmn Records, 1994's The Journey to Planet POD and 1995's Euphonia.

History
Perceptual Outer Dimensions was founded in 1994 out of Virginia as a solo outlet for composer Holmes Ives. He recorded the compositions "Hinge" and "Lurid Dance of the Erimite" and released them on the 1994 Fifth Colvmn Records compilation Frenzied Computer Resonance. Still opting to release with Fifth Colvmn, Ives debuted a full-length studio album titled The Journey to Planet POD for the label in 1995. Perceptual Outer Dimensions released its second studio album for Fifth Colvmn in 1995 titled Euphonia. The same year the track "De La Luna" was released for the Forced Cranial Removal compilation. Ives recorded the new composition "Surya" and it was released on Echo in 1996. Afterwards Holmes abandoned his Perceptual Outer Dimensions moniker and continued to release collaborative and "Holmes Ives presents" projects for his own label OVA Records.

In 2003 Holmes Ives Remixed "Only Your Love" by Seroya and released on Deep Dish offshoot Shinichi, this remix was then featured on Deep Dish DJ Mix Global Underground 025: Toronto.

In 2005 Holmes Ives released "8 Letters" ft. Avalon Frost single on Shinichi Records, an offshoot of Yoshitoshi Recordings from Washington, DC 

In 2005 Holmes Ives and Sophie Melota released the 10 track album "Untie Me" under the Sophie & Ives moniker.

In 2006 Holmes Ives released his "In Love & Light Vol. 1" album on Ova Records, and collaborated with Jette Kelly on the Jette-Ives album "In The Deep"

In 2009 Holmes Ives had several monikers and collaborative production teams to his credit; Jette-Ives, Memnon, Oko Tek, Perceptual Outer Dimensions.

In 2020 Holmes Ives collaborated with Devika Chawla on the original song "Jeb Se Piya", released on Ova Records. The song "Jab Se Piya" was then remixed by Bombay Dub Orchestra and licensed to the Buddha Bar XXIII (2021) Compilation.

Discography
Studio albums
 The Journey to Planet POD (1994, Fifth Colvmn)
 Euphonia (1995, Fifth Colvmn)
 Tetrasomia (2004, OVA Records)
 Satyriasis (2004, OVA Records)
 In Love & Light Vol 1 (2006, OVA Records)
 In Love & Light Vol 2 (2012, OVA Records)
 In Love & Light Vol 3 (2016, OVA Records)
 Pandora (2018, OVA Records)
 Pneuma (2020, Ova Records)
 Once Lost Then Found - Downtempo (2022, OVA Records)
 Once Lost Then Found - Uptempo (2022, OVA Records)

References

External links 
 
 
 

Musical groups established in 1994
1994 establishments in Virginia
American electronic musicians
American industrial musicians
Downtempo musicians
Fifth Colvmn Records artists